Euderces basimaculatus is a species of beetle in the family Cerambycidae. It was described by Giesbert and Chemsak in 1997.

References

Euderces
Beetles described in 1997